Järve Dunes Landscape Conservation Area is a nature park situated in Saare County, Estonia.

Its area is 96 ha.

The protected area was designated in 1959 to protect Järve Dunes (:et). In 2005, the protected area was redesigned to the landscape conservation area.

References

Nature reserves in Estonia
Geography of Saare County